Bob and Brian is a talk radio show broadcast from WHQG in Milwaukee, Wisconsin. Topics of discussion include politics, celebrity gossip, and sports, along with the random daily events.

The show broadcasts weekdays from 5:30 a.m. to 10:15 a.m. and repeats as a week-in-review show on Saturday mornings. It is syndicated in Wisconsin.

Longtime friends who grew up in Union Grove, Wisconsin, Bob Madden and Brian Nelson went to high school and technical college together before teaming up to work in radio in January 1981. They had brief stints for stations in Florida, Missouri, Michigan, and Toledo, Ohio, before moving to Milwaukee's "Lazer 103", WLZR on July 20, 1987 (WLZR has since become WHQG).

Affiliates
WHQG 102.9 FM  "The Hog" Milwaukee - Flagship

Former affiliates

WWHG 105.9 FM "The Hog" Janesville
WWWX 96.9 FM "The Fox" Oshkosh/Fox Valley
WTLX 100.5 FM "ESPN Radio" Madison
WMZK 104.1 FM "Z104" Wausau/Medford
WAPL 105.7 FM "The Rockin' Apple" Appleton
WNFL 1440 AM Green Bay

Cast

Current
Bob Madden, 'The Voice Of Beef' — Host (1987-Current) 
Brian Nelson, 'The Gangster Of Love' — Host (1987-Current) 
Eric 'Rock' Jensen — Producer (1996-Current) 
Carrie Wendt, 'First Lady Of WI  — News (1999-Current) 
'Sportsbabe', Stephanie Sutton — News Fill-in (2010-Current)
Tim Murray — Sports (2018-Current)

Former
 Liz Borden — Traffic (1992–1997); News (1997–1999 ) 
 Duane Gay (1956-2005 RIP) —  Guest Commentator; News Fill-in (199X-2005) 
 Marilynn Mee —  News (1989-1997); "Jackpot Girl" (1989-2005) 
 Dorene "Firegirl" Michaels —  News & Traffic (????-2004) 
 Jeff Miller aka "The Hawk" & "Jeffrey Goodjudgement" — Producer; (1989–1996)
 Dan Patrick —  Sports (1989–1995) 
 Mark Patrick —  Sports (1995–1997) 
 Air Marshall Pedersen —  Air Safety (1995–1998); Softball (1998) 
 Steve "Consumer of Caffeine" Radke — Backup Producer (????-2011) 
Drew Olson— Brewers/Baseball Wednesday's  (1997-2016)
'Sports Donkey', Steve Czaban — Sports (1997-2018)

Segments

Daily 
 "Who’s The Stiff?" (7:00) — A game show pitting two phone-in contestants against each other, with up to five randomly drawn questions. The loser of each round, and the game, is "The Stiff". Daily prizes are awarded and winners are entered into a drawing for a getaway vacation.
 "Sports (8:10) — with Tim Murray" ('It’s Raining Men' by The Weather Girls)
 "This Day in History" (9:20) — Brian recaps the significant events, births, and deaths of that particular day in history.
 "One Question Line" (9:45) — Viewers are allowed to ask a single question. Callers are reminded not to say "Can you tell me ?" "DO you know ? "I was wondering" or "My question is"

Weekly 
 Gary Graff/ Rabbi of Rock (Music Report on Fridays)

Occasional guests 
 The Boogie Men — local Milwaukee band
 Fireman Jim (Theme From Medical Center) — fire safety expert and Star Wars enthusiast
 A. J. Christopher — much-traveled veteran disc jockey
 Vern Cunningham aka "Vern the Carny" — hard of hearing carnie who talks about life at the fair
 Santana Dotson ("Atomic Dog" by George Clinton) — interviewed each Monday, with repeats on Tuesday, during the National Football League season to give his insights
 Jimmy "Masterlock" Dugan ('Viva Las Vegas' by Elvis Presley) — gambling "expert".  Calls in on Fridays during football season to give his picks
 Seth Grunlode ("Shambala" by Three Dog Night) — Lost (TV series) expert
 Matt Kenseth ("Dirt Track Date" by Southern Culture on the Skids) — interviewed each Thursday during NASCAR racing season
 Kirk Rocker — shock jock who talks about "the Man"
 "Skip" — baseball sportswriter with Tourette syndrome
 Joe Panos aka "Mr. Halloween" ("Dance For Halloween" by Chris McKhool) — former offensive lineman for the Philadelphia Eagles and Buffalo Bills in the NFL; unofficial goodwill ambassador for the Halloween season
 Mike Toomey ("Batman Theme" from TV series) — comedian and master impersonator
 Keith Tozer ("Ole Ole Ole") — retired soccer player who coaches the Milwaukee Wave of Major Indoor Soccer League
 Mark Metcalf ("Shama Lama Ding Dong" by Lloyd Williams) — actor who discusses movie news and reviews (was a weekly segment through May 2013)

Occasional segments 
 Fan Letters —  Listeners are given the opportunity to send in stories on various themes throughout the year. The debut series involved boat launch disasters. Letters are eligible for a grand prize.
A list of themes is below:

 All my Packers
 Bad Breakups
 Bad Camping
 Bad Job Interview Stories
 Bad Roommates
 Boat Launch Stories
 Bureaucracy
 Father Knows Least
 First Car
 Football Tales
 Great Outdoors
 Gym Class Stories
 Holiday Horror Stories
 Home Destruction
 Hunting
 Lawn Care Disasters
 Meals Gone Wrong
 Shortest Job
 Smashed In The Face
 Tee’d Off Golfing
 Vacation Disasters
 We're Thinking of a Brewer
 Wedding Disasters
 Worst Jobs
 Wreck The Halls

 Where you goin', What you takin' —  B&B along with Carrie take calls from listeners, usually around major holidays, and simply ask "Where you goin', what you takin'".

Charitable contributions 

 28 Hour Radiothon — During the second week in April, B&B host the 28-hour Radiothon for the Midwest Athletes Against Childhood Cancer (MACC Fund). The Radiothon includes guest interviews with those in the sports and entertainment industry.
 Gutter Bowl — On the last Friday of February, Bob and Brian host a bowling tournament to raise money for the Leukemia and Lymphoma Society of Wisconsin. During the event, items are given out and contests are held. 
 HOG For Hunger — November around Thanksgiving, the Bob & Brian crew, along with the other rock jocks at the station, have a three-day remote broadcast where they seek food donations for the Hunger Task Force of Milwaukee.
 OPEN Golf Outing — Wisconsin’s largest charity golf tournament, held annually on the last Friday in July. Money is raised by purchasing golfing spots. 
 Plane Pull — Hosted every October, the Midwest Airlines-sponsored event features 30 teams of 12 attempting to pull a Midwest Airlines aircraft 15 feet across a tarmac in less than 10 seconds. Teams compete for the top prize of roundtrip travel to any Midwest Airlines destination. Money raised goes to the Midwest Athletes Against Childhood Cancer (MACC) Fund.

Compilation albums
Bob and Brian annually release albums containing highlights of the broadcasting year. The cover artwork is illustrated by local Milwaukeean Matt Zumbo. Proceeds from the album sales go to the Hunger Task Force of Milwaukee and the MACC Fund.

Bob & Brian albums 

 2022 Liberknievelis
 2021 Mustache Fights
 2020 Magnificent Bastards
 2019 Sockets Of Mandoor
 2018 Feces Flingin' Mad
 2017 Vortex of Tragedy
 2016 Dumpster Fulla Bums
 2015 Yankee Doodle S.O.B.
 2014 Shut Yer Gob
 2013 Toilet Cat
 2012 Average Looking Donkeys
 2011 Scrapbook Of Hate
 2010 Lick'n The Beaters
 2009 MyFaceTube
 2008 Pounded Clowns
 2007 Premium Hair Ring
 2006 The Adventures of Captain Wizzo
 2005 Mexican Bologna Roll
 2004 Stench Ranch
 2003 Albanian Love Stories
 2002 Horrifying Zubaz
 2001 By The Numbers
 2000 Very Close Enemies
 1999 What A Blast
 1998 Strange Load
 1997 Warning: Do Not Eat The Contents Of This Package
 1996 Individually Twisted
 1995 Tahellwitchoo
 1994 Ripped
 1993 All My Packers II
 1992 All My Packers

References

External links 
 Bob & Brian website

American variety radio programs
Mass media in Wisconsin